Seán Sherwin (born 1946) is a former Irish Fianna Fáil politician.

He was an unsuccessful candidate for the Dublin South-West constituency at the 1969 general election. However, Dublin South-West's long-serving Labour Party TD Seán Dunne, who had been re-elected at the general election, died only seven days after polling. Sherwin was selected as the Fianna Fáil candidate at the by-election on 4 March 1970, and won, taking his seat in the 19th Dáil.

He resigned from Fianna Fáil in 1971 in the wake of the Arms Crisis, and joined Kevin Boland's new party Aontacht Éireann. The new party failed to take off at the 1973 general election, and Sherwin lost his seat to Fine Gael's Declan Costello.

References

1946 births
Living people
Fianna Fáil TDs
Members of the 19th Dáil